Keskitalo's Third Council was a governing council of the Sámi Parliament of Norway, headed by the President Aili Keskitalo of the Norwegian Sami Association. The governing council was installed on 12 October 2017, following the 2017 Norwegian Sámi parliamentary election, and served until 21 October 2021. It was a coalition council consisting of the Norwegian Sami Association/Norwegian Sami Association and Sami People's Party joint list (NSR/NSR-SáB), the Centre Party, the Reindeer herders list (JSL) and Åarjel-Saemiej Gïelh (ÅAsG), known as the Muohtačalmmit coalition.

Responsibilities
The Governing Council heads the executive branch of the Sami parliamentary system in Norway. The President of the Sami Parliament is the head of the executive branch. The Governing Council is composed by the President and four other council members. They hold full-time positions and are responsible for the daily political business of the Sami Parliament.

List of councillors 

|}

See also
 Sámi politics
 Sámi Parliament of Norway
 Sámi Parliament of Finland
 Sámi Parliament of Sweden
 Sámi Parliament of Russia
 Elections in Norway

References

Politics of Norway
Sámi in Norway
Parliament
Organisations based in Finnmark